John Haven Emerson (February 5, 1906 – February 4, 1997) was an American inventor of biomedical devices, specializing in respiratory equipment. He is perhaps best remembered for his work in improving the iron lung.

Early life
Emerson was born in 1906 in New York City, the son of Dr. Haven Emerson, Health Commissioner of New York City, and Grace Parrish Emerson, the sister of Maxfield Parrish. He was named for his paternal grandfather (1840–1913), who was also a medical doctor.

At the age of 22, he bought a rudimentary machine shop from the estate of a local inventor. He moved the equipment to a small warehouse in Harvard Square, in Cambridge, Massachusetts, where he built research apparatus for professors and researchers of Boston-area medical schools, and produced many inventions over the following years. In 1928, he designed a Barcroft-Warburg apparatus for tissue respiration studies. In 1930, he designed a new type of micromanipulator which was valuable in early physiology studies and later saw use in assembly of electronic components. In 1931, Emerson developed an oxygen tent which incorporated an improved cooling system.

Work on the iron lung
Emerson's father encouraged him to work on an artificial respirator after noticing the beginning of a polio epidemic. Emerson thus began his work on the iron lung in the early 1930s, improving the design of the Drinker lung. Completed in July 1931, Emerson's lung was quieter, lighter, more efficient, and cheaper. With a $1000 price tag, it sold for less than half the price of Drinker's make. Drinker threatened legal action against Emerson, and later filed a lawsuit which backfired. Drinker not only lost the suit, his patents were declared invalid.

Emerson's new design replaced blowers and valves with a flexible diaphragm in a dual layer. This acted as a failsafe: if one layer was torn, the second would continue operation. He also made improvements to the chamber. The first example of this design, nicknamed "Old Number One", is currently on display at the Smithsonian Institution in Washington, DC. Emerson continued to make improvements to the iron lung, adding a quick opening and closing function, an improved pressure gauge, and emergency hand operation. His final improvement was the addition of a transparent positive pressure dome, allowing ventilation when the chamber was opened to care for the patient.

Later inventions
In the mid-1940s, following a suggestion of Dr. Alvin Barach, Emerson perfected the Thunberg barospirator, which caused respiration without moving the lungs at all. Emerson was involved with the development of high-altitude flight valves and SCUBA gear for the Navy shortly before World War II.  In 1942 he developed an automatic resuscitator.  In 1949 he developed a mechanical assistor for anesthesia with the cooperation of the anesthesia department at Harvard.  In 1955 he built a pleural suction pump for postoperative thoracic surgery, the Emerson Postop Pump, which is still widely used.  Late in the twentieth century he assisted Alvin Barach in developing the "In-Exsufflator Cough Machine", a device to aid in secretion removal in patients with neuromuscular disease.

Relatives
Emerson was the brother of Robert Emerson the scientist who discovered that plants have two photoreaction centers. Emerson was the great-grandson of the brother of  Ralph Waldo Emerson. His uncle was the illustrator Maxfield Parrish.
His first cousin was Bartram “Bart” Kelley, also a nephew of Maxfield Parrish, who was a major designer of military helicopters for Bell Aircraft and Bell Helicopter.

Patent images
For the lawsuit involving the iron lung, images were lacking on some of the old patents.  New drawings were supplied to Emerson by his cousin, Maxfield Parrish Jr.

References

External links
Notes on his life and contributions to respiratory care
Obituary at FindArticles.com
J. H. Emerson Co. web site
Paralysis and Profits
Transcript of a 1985 lecture by Emerson
Respiration Without Breathing: The Thunberg Barospirator

1906 births
1997 deaths
People from New York City
20th-century American inventors